The Cross of Merit with Swords is a Polish military award established October 19, 1942, by the Polish Government in Exile.

Criteria
The Cross of Merit with Swords is awarded for deeds of bravery and valor during time of war not connected with direct combat, and for merit demonstrated in perilous circumstances.  The cross may be awarded twice in each grade to the same person.

Grades
The Order has three grades:

Recipients
Stansilaw Lukaszewicz (Bronze Cross of Merit with Swords), Sargeant 10 Dragoons, 1 Polish Armoured Division, 1 Polish Corps for action at Falaise Gap, France 1944.

Bolesław Piwowarczyk (Bronze Cross of Merit with Swords), Sergeant 5th Kresowa Division, 2nd Polish Corps.

Paul Jacot (Silver Cross of Merit with Swords), Civilian For the courage and bravery shown within the Polish organisation (resistance) during the battle for independence on French territory in 1943 and 1944**..

Mieczyslaw Lezanowski (Silver Cross of Merit with Swords), during service in the Middle East then 2nd Lieutenant with the Polish 2nd Corps at the battle of Monte Cassino

[Jan Zaleski (Gliwice)]  (Gold Merit with Swords), Jan Zaleski, son of Marcin, in the ranks of Bataliny Chlopski was awarded in 1944 with the Gold Merit with Swords.

{Charles Gossage Grey} (Golden Cross of Merit with Swords), "For service rendered the development of the Polish Military Intelligence during world War II. Réseau F-2.from Jan 4 1941 to Dec 31 1942

References

Orders, decorations, and medals of Poland
Awards established in 1942
1942 establishments in England